Strahorn is a surname. Notable people with the surname include:

Carrie Adell Strahorn (1854–1925), American explorer and pioneer
Fred Strahorn (born 1965), American politician

See also
Strayhorn (disambiguation)

English-language surnames